The following is a list of the 78 municipalities (comuni) of the Province of Benevento, Campania, Italy.

List

See also
List of municipalities of Italy

References

Benevento